Langar is a village in the Wakhan District of Badakhshan Province, in north-eastern Afghanistan.  It lies on the river Panj, opposite the larger village of Toqakhona in Tajikistan.

The place should not be confused with a seasonal settlement called Langar, also in Wakhan, on the upper Wakhan River, some 130 km east.

Geography

Transport

References 

Populated places in Wakhan District
Wakhan